Psilocin (also known as 4-HO-DMT, 4-hydroxy DMT, psilocine, psilocyn, or psilotsin) is a substituted tryptamine alkaloid and a serotonergic psychedelic substance. It is present in most psychedelic mushrooms together with its phosphorylated counterpart psilocybin. Psilocin is a Schedule I drug under the Convention on Psychotropic Substances. Acting on the 5-HT2A receptors, psilocin modulates the production and reuptake of serotonin. The mind-altering effects of psilocin are highly variable and subjective and resemble those of LSD and DMT.

Chemistry 
Psilocin and its phosphorylated cousin, psilocybin, were first isolated and named in 1958 by Swiss chemist Albert Hofmann. Hofmann obtained the chemicals from laboratory-grown specimens of the entheogenic mushroom Psilocybe mexicana. Hofmann also succeeded in finding synthetic routes to these chemicals.

Psilocin can be obtained by dephosphorylation of natural psilocybin under strongly acidic or under alkaline conditions (hydrolysis). Another synthetic route uses the Speeter–Anthony tryptamine synthesis procedure. 4-hydroxyindole is acylated with oxalyl chloride. The compound is further reacted with an amine, yielding indole-3-yl-glyoxalyamide. Finally, the product amide is reduced using lithium aluminum hydride yielding psilocin. 

Psilocin is relatively unstable in solution due to its phenolic hydroxy (-OH) group. In the presence of oxygen, it readily forms bluish and dark black degradation products. Similar products are also formed under acidic conditions in the presence of oxygen and Fe3+ ions (Keller's reagent).

Structural analogs 
Sulfur analogs are known with a benzothienyl replacement as well as 4-SH-DMT. 1-Methylpsilocin is a functionally 5-HT2C receptor preferring agonist. 4-Fluoro-N,N-dimethyltryptamine is known.  O-Acetylpsilocin (4-AcO-DMT) is an acetylated analog of psilocin. Additionally, replacement of a methyl group at the dimethylated nitrogen with an isopropyl or ethyl group yields 4-HO-MIPT (4-hydroxy-N-methyl-N-isopropyltryptamine) and 4-HO-MET (4-hydroxy-N-methyl-N-ethyltryptamine), respectively. 4-Acetoxy-MET (4-Acetoxy-N-methyl-N-ethyltryptamine), also known as 4-AcO-MET, is the acetate ester of 4-HO-MET, and a homologue of 4-AcO-DMT.

Pharmacology 

Psilocin is the pharmacologically active agent in the body after ingestion of psilocybin or some species of psychedelic mushrooms.

Psilocybin is rapidly dephosphorylated in the body to psilocin which acts as a 5-HT2A, 5-HT2C and 5-HT1A agonist or partial agonist. Psilocin exhibits  functional selectivity in that it activates  phospholipase A2 instead of activating phospholipase C as the endogenous ligand serotonin does. Psilocin is structurally similar to serotonin (5-HT), differing only by the hydroxyl group being on the 4-position rather than the 5 and the dimethyl groups on the nitrogen. Its effects are thought to come from its agonist activity at 5-HT2A serotonin receptors in the prefrontal cortex.

Psilocin has no significant effect on dopamine receptors (unlike LSD) and only affects the noradrenergic system at very high dosages.

Psilocin's half-life ranges from 1 to 3 hours.

Behavioral and non-behavioral effects 

Its physiological effects are similar to a sympathetic arousal state. Specific effects observed after ingestion can include but are not limited to tachycardia, dilated pupils, restlessness or arousal, euphoria, open and closed eye visuals (common at medium to high doses), synesthesia  (e.g. hearing colours and seeing sounds), increased body temperature, headache, sweating and chills, and nausea.  Psilocin acts as a 5-HT2A, 5-HT2C, and 5-HT1A receptor agonist or partial agonist. Such receptors are claimed to significantly regulate visuals, decision making, mood, decreased blood pressure, and heart rate.

There is virtually no direct lethality associated with psilocin. There is virtually no withdrawal syndrome when chronic use of this drug is ceased.  There is cross tolerance among psilocin, mescaline, LSD, and other 5-HT2A, 5-HT2C, and 5-HT1A agonists due to down-regulation of these receptors.

Legal status
The United Nations Convention on Psychotropic Substances (adopted in 1971) requires its members to prohibit psilocybin, and parties to the treaty are required to restrict the use of the drug to medical and scientific research under strictly controlled conditions.

Australia
Psilocin is considered a Schedule 9 prohibited substance in Australia under the Poisons Standard (October 2015). A Schedule 9 substance is a substance which may be abused or misused, the manufacture, possession, sale or use of which should be prohibited by law except when required for medical or scientific research, or for analytical, teaching or training purposes with approval of Commonwealth and/or State or Territory Health Authorities.

Russia
Psilocin and psilocybin are banned in Russia as narcotic drugs with a criminal penalty for possession of at least 50 mg.

See also 

 O-4310
 O-Acetylpsilocin
 Indole
 Metocin
 Miprocin
 Psilocybin
 Psychoactive drug
 Tryptamine

References

External links 
 4-HO-DMT entry in TiHKAL

Dimethylamino compounds
Entheogens
Hydroxyarenes
Mycotoxins
Psilocybin
Psychedelic drugs
Psychedelic tryptamines
Serotonin receptor agonists
Tryptamine alkaloids